George Hanna may refer to:

Politicians
 George Hanna (Australian politician), Australian Greens candidate in the 2019 Electoral results for the Division of Lingiari, Northern Territory
 George Hanna (Belfast MP) (1906–1964), his son, Northern Irish politician
 George Hanna (MP for East Antrim) (1877–1938), Northern Irish barrister, politician and judge

Others
 George Hanna (basketball), Iraqi Olympic basketball player
 George Hanna (translator), British Communist who worked in Russia as a translator
 Pat Hanna (George Patrick Hanna, 1888–1973), New Zealand soldier and entertainer

See also
George Hannah (disambiguation)